Anastasios Tselios (born 14 October 2002) is a Greek professional footballer who plays as a midfielder for Super League 2 club Olympiacos B.

Career statistics

References

2002 births
Living people
Greek footballers
Super League Greece 2 players
Olympiacos F.C. players
Association football midfielders
Footballers from Thessaloniki
PAOK FC players
Aris Thessaloniki F.C. players
Olympiacos F.C. B players